Green Gold Animation Pvt Ltd, is a Hyderabad-based Indian Animation company, with offices in India, Singapore, Philippines and the United States. It is known for creating the Chhota Bheem television series and the Krishna film series. Green Gold Animation was founded by Rajiv Chilaka in January 2001.

As of now, Green Gold Animation handles various branches of business such as Licensing & Merchandising, Digital Business, Branded Stores, Events and Pictures.
Green Gold has produced several animated series, beginning with Bongo, Krishna, Krishna & Balram, Chhota Bheem, Vikram Betal, Chorr Police, Mighty Raju, Luv Kushh and Arjun: The Prince of Bali. Super Bheem, a 3D spin-off of Chhota Bheem with superpowers has begun as a series of short films in 2017.

Green Gold Animation has won numerous awards for its production and brand management, which includes four FICCI Awards, a Business Excellency Award in 2014, two Licensor of the year awards in 2012 and 2013, and its founder and CEO, Rajiv Chilaka won the CII Emerging Entrepreneur Award in 2011.

In 2016, Amazon Prime Video acquired the rights of digital streaming from Green Gold Animation.

Subsidiary 
Green Gold Animation launched Golden Robot Animation, an animation studio in Mumbai in July, 2017.

Series

Theatrical films

See also
List of Indian animated television series

References

Indian companies established in 2001
Indian animation studios
Television production companies of India
Green Gold Animation
2001 establishments in Andhra Pradesh